Cifuentes is a municipality and town in the Villa Clara Province of Cuba founded in 1819 and established as a municipality in 1919.

Demographics
In 2009 the municipality of Cifuentes had a population of 28,850, having dropped from 41,789 in 1976.

The municipality is divided into the barrios of Alacrán, Amaro, Barro, Cabecera Norte, Cabecera Sur, Este, Oeste and Sitio Grande.

See also
Municipalities of Cuba
List of cities in Cuba

References

External links

Populated places in Villa Clara Province 
1819 establishments in North America
Populated places established in 1819
1819 establishments in the Spanish Empire